Eric Jeremy Edgar Dier (born 15 January 1994) is an English professional footballer who plays for  club Tottenham Hotspur and the England national team. A versatile defensive player, Dier has been deployed as a defensive midfielder, a centre-back and a right-back.

Dier grew up in Portugal, where he came through the youth ranks at Sporting CP, making his reserve and senior debuts in 2012 after a loan to Everton. In 2014, he moved to Tottenham Hotspur on a five-year contract for a fee of £4 million. He has made over 200 appearances for Tottenham, including in the 2015 Football League Cup Final and the 2019 UEFA Champions League Final.

Despite interest from Portugal, Dier opted to represent England in international football. He made his debut for the senior team in November 2015, and was chosen for UEFA Euro 2016, the 2018 FIFA World Cup and the 2022 FIFA World Cup.

Early and personal life
Dier was born in Cheltenham, Gloucestershire to Jeremy and Louise Dier. His father is a former professional tennis player. Dier is the grandson of Ted Croker, a former secretary of The Football Association (FA) and president of Cheltenham Town, and great-nephew of Peter Croker, who both played professionally for Charlton Athletic.

Dier moved to Portugal from England when he was seven years old, when his mother was offered a job running the hospitality programme at UEFA Euro 2004. With his parents and five siblings, Dier spent a year living in the Algarve region before moving to Lisbon. In 2010, his parents returned to England while Dier remained in Portugal, living at Sporting CP's academy.

Club career

Early career
While playing football at the International Preparatory School in Lisbon, Dier's footballing ability was spotted by his P.E. teacher Miguel Silva, who referred him to Sporting Lisbon for a trial at the age of eight. Dier signed professional terms with Sporting in April 2010. The Portuguese club beat Arsenal, Manchester United and Tottenham Hotspur to his signature. Sporting also sold 50% economic rights of the player to a third-party owner, Quality Football Ireland Limited. 

In January 2011, Dier agreed to join Everton on loan until 30 June. Sporting CP's official website stated that the loan was "an opportunity for the athlete to grow in a more competitive and demanding environment". Dier represented Everton U18s ten times during his loan spell and won the 2010–11 U18 Premier League with the team. Dier encountered difficulties resettling into English life, but in the summer of 2011, he extended his loan stay in the Everton academy for an additional 12 months.

Breakthrough at Sporting
On 26 August 2012, Dier made his debut with Sporting B in a 2012–13 Segunda Liga 3–1 away win against Atlético, replacing Diego Rubio in the 77th minute. On 4 November 2012, Dier scored his first senior goal with a direct free kick against Benfica B in a 3–1 away win in the Segunda Liga.

On 11 November 2012, Dier was called to play for the first team in a Primeira Liga 1–0 home win against Braga, assisting Ricky van Wolfswinkel for the match's only goal. Fifteen days later, he scored his first goal for Sporting's first squad in a 2–2 league away draw against Moreirense.

Tottenham Hotspur

On 2 August 2014, Dier signed a five-year contract with Tottenham Hotspur in a £4 million transfer. He made his competitive debut for the club on the first day of the 2014–15 Premier League season away to West Ham United on 16 August, and scored the only goal of the match in added time. Eight days later, in his second match and in his White Hart Lane debut, he headed in a corner from Erik Lamela in an eventual 4–0 win over newly promoted Queens Park Rangers. Dier started on 1 March 2015 as Tottenham lost the 2015 League Cup Final to Chelsea at Wembley Stadium.

Dier signed a new contract on 9 September 2015, lasting until 2020. During the 2015–16 season, he was utilised as a defensive midfielder by Tottenham head coach Mauricio Pochettino, establishing himself as the regular partner to Mousa Dembélé as Tottenham challenged eventual champions Leicester City for the Premier League title. On 15 August, he scored Tottenham's first goal of the Premier League season in a 2–2 draw at home to Stoke City, and on 26 September, Dier scored the team's equalising goal in a 4–1 home victory over Manchester City.

On 13 September 2016, Dier signed a new five-year contract to last until 2021. During the 2016–17 season, Dier returned to the centre-back position due to Tottenham's acquisition of defensive midfielder Victor Wanyama and injuries to defenders Toby Alderweireld and Jan Vertonghen. He made his UEFA Champions League debut in a 2–1 loss to AS Monaco FC in Tottenham's opening group match at Wembley Stadium. On 25 October 2016, Dier captained Tottenham for the first time in a 2–1 loss to Liverpool at Anfield in the fourth round of the EFL Cup. He was also given the captain's armband for the 3rd and 4th round FA Cup ties against Aston Villa and Wycombe Wanderers respectively. On 1 April 2017, Dier scored his first goal of 2016–17 in a 2–0 win over Burnley in the Premier League.

In the 2018–19 season, Dier scored his first goal of the season, which is his first in 18 months, in the 1–0 win against Cardiff City, helping Tottenham to their joint best start of a season in the Premier League after eight games. He underwent surgery mid-December 2018 due to appendicitis, and returned to the team on 20 January 2019, coming on as a substitute in the game against Fulham. However, he continued to suffer the after-effects of the appendicitis operation, repeatedly falling ill and missing games. On 1 June, in Tottenham's first appearance in the Champions League final, Dier replaced the injured Moussa Sissoko for the final 16 minutes of a 2–0 loss to Liverpool in Madrid.

Dier had to undergo another procedure before the start of the 2019–20 season, and did not start his first game of the season until 24 September. This game, an EFL Cup game against lower-league Colchester United, ended poorly as they lost in a penalty shoot-out. He performed better in the Champions League game against Red Star Belgrade, helping the team to a 4–0 away win.

On 4 March 2020, Dier was involved in a confrontation with a spectator in the stands following Tottenham's FA Cup defeat by Norwich City. Dier climbed into the lower tier at the Tottenham Hotspur Stadium after the person "insulted" Dier and became involved in a dispute with Dier's brother Patrick who was also in the stand. The following day, the Metropolitan Police said they wish to interview Dier, his brother and the supporter alleged to be involved in the incident. On 23 April, Dier was charged by the FA with misconduct for a breach of FA Rule E3 due to his "improper and/or threatening" action. In July 2020, Dier was fined £40,000 and banned for four games.

On 21 July 2020, Dier signed an improved contract until June 2024.

International career

Youth

Dier had been approached by the Portuguese Football Federation to play for Portugal in the future, but could only do so once he turned 18. He had been involved in a high-profile England national team kit promotion for sportswear manufacturers Umbro. Upon his signing for Everton, an FA spokesman said, "Our intention will be to select him for the youth squad in the coming weeks," referring to the 2011 edition of the under-17 international Algarve Tournament.

Dier earned his first England call-up in November 2011 when under-18 head coach Noel Blake picked him for a match against Slovakia. He played the full 90 minutes in the 1–1 draw on 16 November 2011.

On 28 May 2013, he was named in manager Peter Taylor's 21-man squad for the 2013 FIFA U-20 World Cup. He made his debut on 16 June in a 3–0 win in a warm-up match against Uruguay.

Dier made his debut for the England under-21s on 13 August 2013 in a 6–0 win against Scotland. In 2014, he pulled out of the squad, informing manager Gareth Southgate that he did not want to be deployed as a right-back anymore and would rather work on the centre-back position at his club, Tottenham.

Senior

On 5 November 2015, Dier was selected for the first time to the England senior team by manager Roy Hodgson ahead of friendlies against Spain and France. He made his debut eight days later against the former at Alicante's Estadio José Rico Pérez as a 63rd-minute substitute alongside his Tottenham teammate Dele Alli in a 2–0 loss. Dier made his first start on 17 November against France, a 2–0 win at Wembley. On 26 March 2016, he scored his first international goal, heading Jordan Henderson's corner for the winner in a 3–2 victory against Germany in Berlin.

Dier was chosen for UEFA Euro 2016 in France. In England's opening match against Russia at the Stade Vélodrome, he opened the scoring in the 1–1 draw through a direct free-kick.

On 10 November 2017, Dier captained the England team for the first time in a friendly match against Germany at Wembley that ended in a goalless draw.

He was named in the 23-man England national team squad for the 2018 FIFA World Cup, and captained the squad in the final group stage match against Belgium. Dier scored the decisive penalty in the second round match against Colombia, giving England its first ever World Cup shootout victory and first competitive shootout victory since Euro 1996.

In September 2022, Dier received his first England call-up in 18 months for the UEFA Nations League matches against Italy and Germany. He started in the 1–0 defeat to Italy at the San Siro.

Style of play
Dier can play as a midfielder, centre-back and right-back. It has been noted that his versatility enabled Tottenham's effective adoption of a flexible approach, allowing them to switch systems efficiently within a single match. Dier has said that he has mixed Portuguese and English footballing styles on his own. In 2018, ESPN's Mark Ogden described Dier as "more of a destroyer than a creator".

Career statistics

Club

International

England score listed first, score column indicates score after each Dier goal

Honours
Tottenham Hotspur
Football League Cup/EFL Cup runner-up: 2014–15, 2020–21
UEFA Champions League runner-up: 2018–19

England
UEFA Nations League third place: 2018–19

References

External links

Profile at the Tottenham Hotspur F.C. website
Profile at the Football Association website

1994 births
Living people
Sportspeople from Cheltenham
Footballers from Gloucestershire
English footballers
Association football defenders
Association football midfielders
Sporting CP footballers
Everton F.C. players
Sporting CP B players
Tottenham Hotspur F.C. players
Liga Portugal 2 players
Primeira Liga players
Premier League players
England youth international footballers
England under-21 international footballers
England international footballers
UEFA Euro 2016 players
2018 FIFA World Cup players
2022 FIFA World Cup players
English expatriate footballers
Expatriate footballers in Portugal
English expatriate sportspeople in Portugal